Uroš Tomović (born 3 April 1994) is a Serbian footballer currently playing as a forward for Liaoning Shenyang Urban.

Career statistics

Club
.

References

1994 births
Living people
Footballers from Belgrade
Serbian footballers
Association football forwards
Serbian First League players
FK Rad players
FK Srem Jakovo players
OFK Žarkovo players
FK BASK players
FK Radnički Pirot players
FK Sinđelić Beograd players
Senglea Athletic F.C. players
FK Radnički Beograd players
Xinjiang Tianshan Leopard F.C. players
Serbian expatriate footballers
Serbian expatriate sportspeople in Malta
Expatriate footballers in Malta
Serbian expatriate sportspeople in China
Expatriate footballers in China